Lindsay Davenport and Lisa Raymond were the defending champions but they competed with different partners in 2004, Davenport with Corina Morariu and Raymond with Martina Navratilova.

Davenport and Morariu lost in the semifinals to Virginia Ruano Pascual and Paola Suárez, while Raymond and Navratilova lost to Anastasia Myskina and Vera Zvonareva in the second round.

Pascual and Suárez went on to win in the final 6–1, 6–2 against Svetlana Kuznetsova and Elena Likhovtseva.

Seeds
Champion seeds are indicated in bold text while text in italics indicates the round in which those seeds were eliminated.

Draw

Final

Top half

Bottom half

Qualifying

Seeds

Qualifiers
  Denisa Chládková /  Ľubomíra Kurhajcová

Qualifying draw

External links
 Official results archive (ITF)
 Official results archive (WTA)

2004 Pacific Life Open
Pacific Life Open